Downtown Elkins Historic District is a national historic district located at Elkins, Randolph County, West Virginia.  It encompasses 65 contributing buildings in the central business district of Elkins.  It includes mostly commercial buildings constructed in the late-19th and early-20th century.  Notable buildings include the Dann Building (1897), Randolph Company (1896), Randolph Hotel (1893), Wallace Bakery (1895), railroad depot (1908), Ward Building (1908), First United Methodist Church (1904), Hotel Delmonte (1899), Darden Block (1906), Brown Building (1906), Stalnaker Block (1900), and Post Office and Federal Building (now City Hall, 1917).

It was listed on the National Register of Historic Places in 1995.

Notes

References

National Register of Historic Places in Randolph County, West Virginia
Historic districts in Randolph County, West Virginia
Italianate architecture in West Virginia
Neoclassical architecture in West Virginia
Historic districts on the National Register of Historic Places in West Virginia
Buildings and structures in Elkins, West Virginia